Svend Munck (16 April 1899 – 1 May 1974) was a Danish fencer. He competed in the sabre and foil events at the 1924 Summer Olympics.

References

External links
 

1899 births
1974 deaths
Sportspeople from Copenhagen
Danish male sabre fencers
Olympic fencers of Denmark
Fencers at the 1924 Summer Olympics
Danish male foil fencers